Dragon's Bait by Vivian Vande Velde is a fantasy novel for young readers that was published in 2003. The 
Harcourt/Magic Carpet Books copies show the copyright as 1992.

Plot summary
Alys has been falsely accused of witchcraft and is about to be sacrificed to a dragon.  Then, Selendrile, a LeGuinian dragon that can assume a human form, offers to help her retaliate. Along the way to revenge against her inquisitor, Alys and Selendrile find a complicated path. This adventure looks at issues of revenge, heroism, and more with a splash of irony.

Awards and honors
 ALA Quick Pick
 American Library Association Recommended Books for the Reluctant Young Adult Reader
 Junior Library Guild selection
 New York Public Library Books for the Teen Age

References

2003 novels
2003 fantasy novels
American children's novels
Children's fantasy novels
Novels about dragons
Novels by Vivian Vande Velde
2003 children's books